British Spanish or Spanish British may refer to:
Spain – United Kingdom relations
Spanish language in the United Kingdom

British Spanish, British Spaniards, Spanish British, or Spanish Britons may refer to:
Britons in Spain
Spaniards in the United Kingdom

See also
Latin Americans in the United Kingdom